Land lobster may mean:
The Lord Howe Island stick insect: Dryococelus australis
Bulkier members of the Phasmatodea (stick & leaf insects) in general
Whip scorpion/vinegaroon: Uropygi

Animal common name disambiguation pages